Uzu Hotel or Ozoo or Ouzou Hotel is a hotel in Benghazi, Libya, overlooking the  23 July Lake of the inner harbour. It contains 184 rooms (or 262 according to two other sources) and is served by the Jasmine Cafe. The hotel was once nearly destroyed by a missile.

References

Hotels in Benghazi
Hotel buildings completed in 1989